Fox was a Norwegian entertainment television channel owned and produced by Fox Networks Group. It was launched on March 21, 2011 as Fox Crime, and changed to current name on July 1, 2013. The channel ceased broadcasts on March 31, 2021, with most of its content shifting to Disney+.

References

External links
 

Norway
Defunct television channels in Norway
Television channels and stations established in 2011
Television channels and stations disestablished in 2021
2011 establishments in Norway
2021 disestablishments in Norway